Mamma Mia! Original Cast Recording is the original cast album for the ABBA-inspired stage musical of the same name. The album was released in 1999 and it reached No.56 in the UK album chart, with 2 weeks on the chart. Re-interest in this 1999 Original London Cast album caused it to reach #12 in the UK Album Chart, having charted at #16 a week earlier. It features performances by the original London cast of the musical including Lisa Stokke, Siobhán McCarthy and Hilton McRae. The album was produced by the two male members of ABBA, Benny Andersson and Björn Ulvaeus.

The album featured a number of ABBA's best known songs, including the title track, "Dancing Queen", "Gimme! Gimme! Gimme! (A Man After Midnight)" and "Thank You for the Music".

Track listing

Original release
 "Overture / Prologue" - Lisa Stokke—2:56
 "Honey, Honey" - Lisa Stokke, Eliza Lumley, and Melissa Gibson—2:02
 "Money, Money, Money" - Siobhán McCarthy, Louise Plowright, Jenny Galloway, Neal Wright, and Company—3:01
 "Mamma Mia" - Siobhán McCarthy and Company-3:21
"Thank You for the Music" - Lisa Stokke,   Hilton McRae, Paul Clarkson, and Nicolas Colicos-3:03
 "Chiquitita" - Louise Plowright, Jenny Galloway, and Siobhán McCarthy—2:27
 "Dancing Queen" - Louise Plowright, Jenny Galloway, and Siobhán McCarthy—3:44
 "Lay All Your Love on Me" - Andrew Langtree, Lisa Stokke, and Company—3:34
 "Super Trouper" - Siobhán McCarthy, Jenny Galloway, Louise Plowright, and Female Company—3:56
 "Gimme! Gimme! Gimme! (A Man After Midnight)" - Female Company—3:34
 "The Name of the Game" - Lisa Stokke and Nicolas Colicos—3:22
 "Voulez-Vous" - Company—3:29
 "Entr'acte" - Musical cast—2:17
 "Under Attack" - Lisa Stokke and Company—3:11
 "One of Us" - Siobhán McCarthy—2:20
 "SOS" - Siobhán McCarthy and Hilton McRae—2:44
 "Does Your Mother Know" - Louise Plowright, Neal Wright, and Company—3:21
 "Knowing Me, Knowing You" - Hilton McRae—2:42
 "Our Last Summer" - Paul Clarkson and Siobhán McCarthy—2:42
 "Slipping Through My Fingers" - Siobhán McCarthy and Lisa Stokke—3:36
 "The Winner Takes It All" - Siobhán McCarthy—4:08
 "Take a Chance on Me" - Jenny Galloway and Nicolas Colicos—3:33
 "I Do, I Do, I Do, I Do, I Do" - Hilton McRae, Siobhán McCarthy, and Company—2:29
 "I Have a Dream" - Lisa Stokke—2:58

5th anniversary edition
The album was re-released in 2004, five years after its initial release to commemorate the musical's 5th anniversary. The new edition contained the original 24 tracks as well as three bonus tracks: the encore versions of "Dancing Queen", "Mamma Mia", and "Waterloo".

Another 5th anniversary release, which debuted in 2006, commemorates the Broadway production, which debuted in 2001.

Also included is a deluxe souvenir booklet complete with lyrics and glimpses of Donna Sheridan in international productions, and a bonus DVD that basically gives a behind-the-scenes look at the musical as well as glimpses of international productions of the musical. An additional bonus feature includes clips of the West End cast singing "Money, Money, Money" and "Dancing Queen", as well as fond memories from original Broadway cast members Joe Machota and Tina Maddigan, who play the roles of Sky and Sophie, respectively.

Bonus tracks

"Mamma Mia" (Encore) - Company
"Dancing Queen" (Encore) - Siobhán McCarthy, Louise Plowright, Jenny Galloway, and Company
"Waterloo" (Encore) - Siobhán McCarthy, Louise Plowright, Jenny Galloway, and Company

Cast
Lisa Stokke as Sophie Sheridan
Siobhán McCarthy as Donna Sheridan
Louise Plowright as Tanya
Jenny Galloway as Rosie
Paul Clarkson as Harry
Hilton McCrae as Sam
Nicolas Colicos as Bill

Reception

Weekly charts

Year-end charts

Accolades

References

External links
 Amazon

Cast recordings
1999 soundtrack albums
ABBA tribute albums
Theatre soundtracks
Decca Records soundtracks
Polydor Records soundtracks
Mamma Mia!